Annelie Ehrhardt, (née Jahns on 18 June 1950) is a retired German hurdler. She won the gold medal in the inaugural 100 metre hurdles event at the 1972 Summer Olympics held in Munich, Germany, setting a new world record, and becoming the first East German Olympic Champion in this event. She also won a silver medal at the 1971 European Championships and a gold medal at the 1974 European Championships in a new championship record of 12.66 seconds.

Born Annelie Jahns, she married Olympic sprint canoer Manfred Ehrhardt in 1970 and became known under her married name. During her career Ehrhardt won 11 national titles and set 20 world records over various hurdle distances, indoors and outdoors. She was a photo laboratory assistant by profession.

References 

1950 births
Living people
People from Börde (district)
East German female hurdlers
Sportspeople from Saxony-Anhalt
Olympic athletes of East Germany
Athletes (track and field) at the 1972 Summer Olympics
Athletes (track and field) at the 1976 Summer Olympics
Olympic gold medalists for East Germany
World record setters in athletics (track and field)
European Athletics Championships medalists
Medalists at the 1972 Summer Olympics
Olympic gold medalists in athletics (track and field)